Johnson County Courthouse may refer to:

 Johnson County Courthouse (Arkansas), Clarksville, Arkansas
 Johnson County Courthouse (Georgia), Wrightsville, Georgia
 Johnson County Courthouse (Illinois), Vienna, Illinois
Johnson County Courthouse (Indiana), Franklin, Indiana, listed on the National Register of Historic Places
 Johnson County Courthouse (Iowa), Iowa City, Iowa
 Johnson County Courthouse (Kansas), Olathe, Kansas
 Johnson County Courthouse (Old Public Square, Warrensburg, Missouri)
 Johnson County Courthouse (Courthouse Square, Warrensburg, Missouri)
 Johnson County Courthouse (Nebraska), Tecumseh, Nebraska
 Johnson County Courthouse (Texas), Cleburne, Texas
 Johnson County Courthouse (Wyoming), Buffalo, Wyoming